Schoolfield School Complex is a complex of historic school buildings located at Danville, Virginia.  The complex consists of Building A, built in 1912 or 1913, Building B, built in 1936 or 1937, and Building C, built in 1939 or 1940. Building A is a 2 1/2-story, Prairie School style brick building with deep eaves that cap a narrow elongated structure, multi-paned massed windows, and horizontal masonry banding. It has an entry tower and addition built in 1933.  Building B is a vernacular brick building that operated as a vocational center.  Building C is a one-story, brick Colonial Revival style elementary school building. It was originally built as a Public Works Administration project and housed Schoolfield High School.  The complex was built by the Riverside & Dan River Cotton Mill Company as part of the mill worker neighborhood called "Schoolfield Village."

It was listed on the National Register of Historic Places in 2009.

Gallery

References

Public Works Administration in Virginia
School buildings on the National Register of Historic Places in Virginia
Colonial Revival architecture in Virginia
School buildings completed in 1913
Buildings and structures in Danville, Virginia
National Register of Historic Places in Danville, Virginia
1913 establishments in Virginia